Elvira Stinissen (born 26 March 1979) is a Dutch Paralympic sitting volleyball player. She is part of the Netherlands women's national sitting volleyball team.

She competed at the  2008 Summer Paralympics finishing third,
2012 Summer Paralympics, and 2016 Summer Paralympics.

She was on the International Paralympic Committee, Athletes’ Council.

References

External links 
 official website
 Paralympic profile

1979 births
Living people
Dutch amputees
Dutch sitting volleyball players
Dutch sportswomen
Medalists at the 2008 Summer Paralympics
Paralympic volleyball players of the Netherlands
Volleyball players at the 2008 Summer Paralympics
Volleyball players at the 2012 Summer Paralympics
Women's sitting volleyball players
Paralympic medalists in volleyball
Paralympic bronze medalists for the Netherlands
20th-century Dutch women
21st-century Dutch women